Marconne is a commune in the Pas-de-Calais department in the Hauts-de-France region of France.

Geography
Marconne is a suburb of Hesdin, situated 14 miles (22 km) southeast of Montreuil-sur-Mer, on the D140 road.

Population

Places of interest
 The church of Saint-Maurice, dating from the sixteenth century.

See also
 Communes of the Pas-de-Calais department

References

Communes of Pas-de-Calais
Artois